WHJC is a Southern Gospel formatted broadcast radio station licensed to Matewan, West Virginia, serving Matewan, Central Mingo County, West Virginia and Northeastern Pike County, Kentucky.  WHJC is owned and operated by Evelyn Warren, through licensee Coalfields Society Foundation Inc.

External links

Gospel radio stations in the United States
Radio stations established in 1951
1951 establishments in West Virginia
Southern Gospel radio stations in the United States
HJC
HJC
Mingo County, West Virginia